The 2002 British Rowing Championships known as the National Championships at the time, were the 31st edition of the National Championships, held from 19–21 July 2002 at the National Water Sports Centre in Holme Pierrepont, Nottingham. They were organised and sanctioned by British Rowing, and are open to British rowers. A record 822 crews competed at the event.

Senior

Medal summary

Lightweight

Medal summary

Coastal

Medal summary

U 23

Medal summary

Junior

Medal summary 

Key

References 

British Rowing Championships
British Rowing Championships
British Rowing Championships